Santiago Ziesmer (born 25 July 1953) is a Spanish-born German actor.

Career
Ziesmer trained in theater from 1972 to 1975 in the theater studio "Hanny Herter" in Berlin. Since 1973, he has regularly acted in theater. He has had a recurring role in the RTL Television series Hinter Gittern – Der Frauenknast.

Ziesmer is best known for dubbing over Jaleel White as Steve Urkel in Family Matters, Ren Höek in The Ren & Stimpy Show (alongside Oliver Feld's Stimpy), and SpongeBob SquarePants in the official German dub. He is also the official German dub voice of Steve Buscemi, the dubover voice of Ted Schmidt in Queer as Folk, and the dubover voice of the Chris Rock character Pookie in the film New Jack City. He is the German voices of Wakko Warner from Animaniacs and Dale Gribble from King of the Hill. He has supplied his voice to a number of Disney productions, including the German dub of DuckTales as Dewey and the Winnie-the-Pooh series as Piglet, and Beauty and the Beast as LeFou. Ziesmer played a dual role in the popular Dragon Ball franchise as the first voice of Vegeta in Dragon Ball Z and Gil in Dragon Ball GT and he also voiced Monokuma in Danganronpa: The Animation.

Voice acting roles (selection) 
Steve Buscemi

 1991: as Chet in Barton Fink (original dubbing)
 1993–1999: as Gordon Pratt in Homicide: Life on the Street (season 3, Das Spiel ist aus)
 1994–2009: as Art Masterson in Emergency Room – Die Notaufnahme (season 14, episode 19)
 1996: as Map to the Stars Eddie in Flucht aus L.A.
 1997: as Garland Greene in Con Air
 1998: as Rockhound in Armageddon – Das jüngste Gericht
 2001: as Ray Coleman in Domestic Disturbance
 2002: as Romero in Spy Kids 2 – Die Rückkehr der Superspione
 2003: as Romero in Mission 3D
 2005: as McCord in Die Insel
 2006: as Les Galantine in Blitzlichtgewitter (dubbing: 2011)
 2006–2013: as Lenny Wosniak in 30 Rock
 2007: as Clinton Fitzer in Chuck und Larry – Wie Feuer und Flamme
 2009: as Frank in Rage
 2009: as George Twisp in Youth in Revolt (dubbing: 2012)
 2010: as Wiley in Kindsköpfe
 2011: as Bill Blago in Rampart – Cop außer Kontrolle
 2012: as Mitfahrgelegenheit in On the Road – Unterwegs
 2013: as Wiley in Kindsköpfe 2
 2013: as Anton Marvelton in Der unglaubliche Burt Wonderstone
 2014: as Jimmy in Cobbler – Der Schuhmagier
 2017: as Nikita Chruschtschow in The Death of Stalin
 2017: as Del Montgomery in Lean on Pete
 since 2019: as God in Miracle Workers
 2019: as Farmer Frank Miller in The Dead Don't Die

Tom Kenny

 since 1999: as SpongeBob SquarePants in SpongeBob SquarePants
 since 1999: as Opa Schwammkopf in SpongeBob Schwammkopf (season 3, Der fliegende Schwamm)
 since 1999: as Enkel von SpongeBob in SpongeBob Schwammkopf (season 7, Das große Zugabenteuer)
 2003: as Alien #1 in Scary Movie 3
 2004: as SpongeBob Schwammkopf in Der SpongeBob Schwammkopf Film
 2008–2011: as Bingo in True Jackson (season 2, episode 10 & 13)
 2009: as Kronecker in Cosmic Quantum Ray
 2015: als SpongeBob Schwammkopf in SpongeBob Schwammkopf 3D *2021: as SpongeBob SquarePants
 2020: als SpongeBob Schwammkopf in SpongeBob Schwammkopf: Eine Schwammtastische Rettung (credited as Santiago Ziesmer Girol)

Alec Mapa

 1988: as Yasu Wade in Die grellen Lichter der Großstadt
 1998: as Lana in Leben und lieben in L.A.
 2004–2012: as Vern in Desperate Housewives (season 2–3)
 2005–2010: as Bibliotheksangestellter in Numbers – Die Logik des Verbrechens (season 6, Alte Krieger)
 2006–2010: as Suzuki St. Pierre in Ugly Betty
 2011–2017: as Lawrence in 2 Broke Girls (season 5, episode 13)
 2013–2016: as Jerry in Devious Maids – Schmutzige Geheimnisse (season 1, episode 1–3 & 13)
 2013–2018: as Babybewerter in Die Thundermans (season 2, episode 24–25)
 since 2013: as Milo in Mom (season 3, episode 10)
 since 2014: as Jack Frittleman in Henry Danger
 since 2014: as Neil in Black-ish (season 3, episode 9)

John Fiedler

 1977: as Ferkel in Die vielen Abenteuer von Winnie Puuh (dubbing: 1994)
 1988–1991: as Ferkel in Neue Abenteuer mit Winnie Puuh (dubbing: 1995)
 1997: as Ferkel in Winnie Puuh auf großer Reise
 2000: as Ferkel in Tiggers großes Abenteuer
 2001–2002: as Ferkel in Winnie Puuh's Bilderbuch
 2001–2002: as Ferkel in Mickys Clubhaus
 2002: as Ferkel in Winnie Puuh – Honigsüße Weihnachtszeit
 2003: as Ferkel in Ferkels großes Abenteuer
 2004: as Ferkel in Winnie Puuh – Spaß im Frühling
 2005: as Ferkel in Heffalump – Ein neuer Freund für Winnie Puuh

Jaleel White

 1989–1998: as Steve Urkel in Alle unter einem Dach
 2000–2015: as Kenny Greene in CSI: Vegas (season 14, Leichtes Handgepäck)
 since 2003: as Martin Thomas in Navy CIS (season 9, episode 13)
 2004–2008: as Kevin Givens in Boston Legal (season 3, episode 20)
 2004–2012: as Porter in Dr. House (season 8, episode 1)
 2006: as Künstleragent in Dreamgirls
 2006–2014: as Tony in Psych (2 episoden)
 2009–2016: as Mickey Franks in Castle (season 7, episode 22)

Tony Cox

 1994: as Dwarf Guard in Das Schweigen der Hammel
 2000: as Limofahrer in Ich, beide & sie
 2006: as Hitch in Date Movie
 2006–2014: as Tony Cox in Psych (season 5, episode 14)
 2007: as Bink in Fantastic Movie
 2010: as Eight-Ball in The Warrior's Way
 2011: as Minoritees in 301 – Scheiß auf ein Empire (dubbing: 2014)

Conrad Vernon

 2001: as Pfefferkuchenmann in Shrek – Der tollkühne Held
 2003: as Pfefferkuchenmann in Shrek 4-D
 2004: as Pfefferkuchenmann in Shrek 2 – Der tollkühne Held kehrt zurück
 2007: as Pfefferkuchenmann in Shrek – Oh du Shrekliche
 2007: as Pfefferkuchenmann in Shrek der Dritte
 2010: as Pfefferkuchenmann in Für immer Shrek

Danny Woodburn

 1990–1998: als Mickey in Seinfeld
 1996–2000: als Joseph Calumbrito in Allein gegen die Zukunft (season 4, Menschenjagd)
 2000: als Little Rocko in Die Flintstones in Viva Rock Vegas
 2005–2017: als Alex Radswell in Bones – Die Knochenjägerin (season 2, episode 6)
 2007–2012: als Mitch in iCarly (season 2, Ein Schrottbaum zu Weihnachten)
 2012–2014: als Mr. Poulos in Crash & Bernstein

Anthony Michael Hall

 1985: as Brian Ralph Johnson in The Breakfast Club
 1985: as Gary Wallace in L.I.S.A. – Der helle Wahnsinn
 1997: as Busfahrer in No Night Stand
 1999: as Bill Gates in Die Silicon Valley Story

Verne Troyer

 2002: as Attila in Hard Cash – Die Killer vom FBI
 2003: as Verne Troyer in Pauly Shore is Dead
 2008: as Coach Punch Cherkov in Der Love Guru
 2009: as Percy in Das Kabinett des Doktor Parnassus

Travis Oates
 2007: als Ferkel in Meine Freunde Tigger & Puuh
 2011: als Ferkel in Winnie Puuh

Michael J. Anderson
 1995: as Mr. Nutt in The X Files (season 2, episode 20)
 2003–2005 as Samson in Carnivàle
 2010: as Biggie  in Cold Case (season 7, episode 14)

Rob Paulsen

Frank Welker

Filmography (selection) 

 1963: Alle Loks pfeifen für Jan
 1965: Das Schiff Esperanza
 1967: Till, der Junge von nebenan
 1967: Der falsche Prinz
 1968: Saids Schicksale
 1968: Mein Kapitän ist tot
 1974: Auch ich war nur ein mittelmäßiger Schüler
 1975: Mozart – Aufzeichnungen einer Jugend
 1975: Ein neuer Start
 1976: Aktion Grün
 1978: 
 1980: Sunday Children
 1985: Drei Damen vom Grill
 1986: Hals über Kopf – Vampire
 1987: Praxis Bülowbogen
 1989: Rivalen der Rennbahn
 1994: Der Havelkaiser
 1995: Frauenarzt Dr. Markus Merthin – Abschied
 1998: Letzte Chance für Harry
 1998–2001: Hinter Gittern – Der Frauenknast
 2002: Schloss Einstein – episode 206
 2005: Helena – Die anderen Leben
 2008: H3 – Halloween Horror Hostel
 2010: Konferenz der Tiere
 2012: Der Gründer
 2013: Planet USA
 2013: Quiqueck & Hämat – Proll Out
 2019: Patchwork Gangsta
2019: Goblin 2

Shows (selection) 
 1991–1996: as Ren Hoek in The Ren & Stimpy Show
 2012: as Porky Pig in The Looney Tunes Show
 2016: as Clancee in Ninjago
 2021: as Howard the Duck in What If...?
 2021: as Heimerdinger in Arcane: League of Legends

Additional Voices 
 1992: Porco Rosso
 1997–2006: Space Goofs
 2017: Cars 3

Video games (selection) 
 2009: as Jorge in The Book of Unwritten Tales
 2010: as Marcusi/Verrückter Imker/Bosnickel in Drakensang: Am Fluss der Zeit
 2014: as Aloys la Touche in Assassin's Creed Unity
 2015: as Jorge/Papagei in The Book of Unwritten Tales 2
 2015: as SpongeBob Schwammkopf (SpongeBob Heldenschwamm)
 2016: as Narrator in Call of Duty: Infinite Warfare (Zombies in Spaceland)
2020: as Skippy in Cyberpunk 2077

External links
Personal website
Literature of and over Santiago Ziesmer in the catalog of the German National Library

Santiago Ziesmer on the German Dubbing Card Index

1953 births
Living people
German male stage actors
German male voice actors
German people of Spanish descent